The Coach of the Year Award is given annually to college football's top head coach. The award for the Division I Football Bowl Subdivision is selected by ESPN and ABC college football analysts. Brian Kelly is the only coach to have been awarded multiple times.

Winners

References

College football coach of the year awards in the United States
Awards established in 1994
1994 establishments in the United States